Results and statistics from Maria Sharapova's 2006 tennis season.

Yearly summary

Australian Open series 
Maria Sharapova began her season at the Australian Open, as the fourth seed. After overcoming a tricky section which included Serena Williams and Daniela Hantuchová, she reached the semi-finals for the second (of four) consecutive year, where she fell in three sets to Justine Henin-Hardenne.

Indian Wells & Miami 
Sharapova won her first title of the year at Indian Wells, by defeating compatriot Elena Dementieva in the final in straight sets; it was her first title since she won Birmingham in 2005, and it was the eleventh final out of the last thirteen contested in which she won. Her good form continued into Miami, where she also reached the final for the second consecutive year. However, she was defeated in straight sets by Svetlana Kuznetsova; this marked only the fourth final in which she lost. After the latter defeat, Sharapova took two months off the Tour to recover from a foot injury.

European clay court season 
Sharapova was seeded fourth at the French Open. In the first round, she overcame Mashona Washington, saving three match points in the process. She then lost in the fourth round to Dinara Safina (after leading 5–1 in the final set), thus failing to make the quarter-finals of the French Open for the first time since 2003.

Wimbledon 
Sharapova was again seeded fourth at Wimbledon, where she reached the semi-finals for the third consecutive year. After winning her first three matches in straight sets, she was more sternly tested by Flavia Pennetta in the fourth round, but still pulled through in three sets.

In the final eight, she faced first-time Wimbledon quarter-finalist Elena Dementieva and won through in straight sets after a streaker briefly interrupted the match in the second set.

In the semi-finals, she lost to Amélie Mauresmo, who eventually captured the title. This marked the fifth time since her Wimbledon victory in 2004 in which she lost to the eventual champion at a Major, and also the fifth time in which she was defeated in the semi-finals of a Major tournament.

US Open series 
In the lead-up to the US Open, Sharapova captured her second title of the season by defeating Kim Clijsters in the final of the Acura Classic in San Diego, and in doing so claimed her first victory over the Belgian in five attempts.

Sharapova entered the US Open as the third seed. She defeated Michaëlla Krajicek, Émilie Loit, Elena Likhovtseva, Li Na and Tatiana Golovin all in straight sets, before being tested in three sets by World No. 1 Amélie Mauresmo, who had beaten her at Wimbledon earlier in the year. Sharapova would be too good for the Frenchwoman this time, winning in three sets, two of which were won without dropping a game. In the final, she faced Belgian Justine Henin-Hardenne, who had previously captured the title in 2003 (and would do so again in 2007), and recorded an impressive straight sets victory to claim her second Grand Slam title at just 19 years of age.

Fall series 
After her success at the us open she won back to back titles at the tier 1 Zurich Open by defeating Shahar Pe'er, Timea Bacsinszky, Katarina Srebotnik, Daniela Hantuchova. She also won the tier 2 Linz Open by defeating Nadia Petrova in the final and thus taking her 5th title of the year.

WTA Tour Championships 
Sharapova qualified for the year-end WTA Tour Championships for the third consecutive year, having captured five titles during the regular season. As the second seed, she was drawn in the Red Group along with Kim Clijsters, Svetlana Kuznetsova and Elena Dementieva. Sharapova went through the round robin stage undefeated, and thus qualified for the semi-finals after finishing first in the group.

The semi-final saw her up against Justine Henin-Hardenne for the fourth time in the year. Sharapova was defeated in straight sets, thus bringing an end to her otherwise impressive 2006 season.

All matches 
This table chronicles all the matches of Sharapova in 2006, including walkovers (W/O) which the WTA does not count as wins. They are marked ND for non-decision or no decision.

Singles matches

Tournament schedule

Singles Schedule

Yearly Records

Head-to-head matchups 
Ordered by number of wins
  Elena Dementieva 3–1
 Martina Hingis 2–1
  Daniela Hantuchova 2–0
  Shahar Peer 2–0
  Ashley Harkleroad 2–0
  Eleni Daniilidou 1–0
  Jelena Kostanic Tosic 1–0
  Ana Ivanovic 1–0
  Sandra Kloese 1–0
  Kim Clijsters 1–2
  Svetlana Kuznetsova 1–1
  Nadia Petrova 2–0
  Patty Schnyder 2–0
  Justine Henin 2–2
  Timea Bacsinszky 1–0
  Katarina Srebotnik 1–0
  Daniela Hantuchova 2–0
  Ekaterina Bychkova 1–0
  Marion Bartoli 1–0
  Dinara Safina 1–1
  Anastasia Rodionova 1–0
  Anna Chakvetadze 0–1

Finals

Singles: 7 (5–2)

See also 
 2006 Serena Williams tennis season
 2006 WTA Tour

References

External links 

Maria Sharapova tennis seasons
Sharapova, Maria
2006 in Russian tennis